Matthias Kimmerl (* 16 June 1818 in Kaiserebersdorf; † 13 January 1883 Kaiserebersdorf) was an Austrian judge. The Viennese Kimmerlgasse was named after him.

Kimmerl family
The Kimmerl family is of Bavarian origin, "Kimmerl" used to mean "the darling" and comes from "worry", "sorrow" or "because of which one is most worried". 

Matthias Kimmerl was born as the son of the landowner and business operator Matthias Kimmerl (* 1786) and Theresia Kimmerl.  He took over his father's business and function in the Kaiserbersdorf community. Matthias Kimmerl was the last to fulfill the post of imperial local judge of Kaiserebersdorf, which was incorporated into the 11th Viennese district of Vienna in 1892. In 1894 the street previously called Feldgasse was renamed Kimmerlgasse. Kimmerl's son, who was also called Matthias Kimmerl, owned large grounds in the area around Kaiserebersdorf, Rannersdorf and Schwechat.

References

External link 
 

Austrian judges
19th-century judges 
1818 births
1883 deaths
Simmering (Vienna)